Romain Spano Rahou (born 31 October 1994) is a French professional footballer who plays as a forward for  club Annecy.

Career
Spano trained as a youth player with Grenoble and Saint-Étienne before joining the Lens training centre. He joined Andrézieux in the winter of 2015–16.

After a successful start to the 2017–18 season with Andrézieux (scoring 10 goals in 13 league appearances), Spano signed his first professional contract with Clermont of the French Ligue 2 on 19 December 2017. He made his professional debut with Clermont in a 0–0 Ligue 2 tie with Tours on 12 January 2018. In June 2018 he joined Bourg-en-Bresse on loan for the 2018–19 season.

In July 2019, Spano terminated his contract with Clermont, signing for Annecy on a two-year deal.

Personal life
Spano was born in France to an Italian father and an Algerian mother. Spano is the twin brother of Maxime Spano, who is also a professional footballer.

References

External links
 
 
 

1994 births
Living people
Twin sportspeople
People from Aubagne
Sportspeople from Bouches-du-Rhône
Association football forwards
French footballers
French people of Italian descent
French sportspeople of Algerian descent
Clermont Foot players
Football Bourg-en-Bresse Péronnas 01 players
FC Annecy players
Ligue 2 players
Championnat National players
Championnat National 2 players
Championnat National 3 players
Footballers from Provence-Alpes-Côte d'Azur